Mollah Jalaluddin Ahmed (1926-1979) was a Bangladesh Awami League politician and Minister of Land in the government of Sheikh Mujib.

Early life
Ahmed was born on 1 February 1926 in Barfa, Gopalganj, East Bengal. He completed graduate school and law school in Dhaka University. He started his legal career at the Dhaka Bar.

Career
He started polictis with the Bangiya Muslim Student League. He was involved in the Sylhet Referendum. He is one of the founding members of the Awami Muslim League. He was active in the language movement of 1952. From 1964 to 1972 he was a member of the executive committee of awami league. in 1966 he was jailed for his involvement in the protests for Awami Leagues Six Point Program. He was released in 1968.

In 1970 he to the Pakistan National Assembly.During the Bangladesh Liberation war he visited countries in the Middle East as representative of the Mujibnagar government to gather support for the Bangladesh side. He was the ambassador of Bangladesh to Lebanon. In 1973 He has elected to Bangladesh Parliament from Gopalganj. He served as a minister in the government. From 1972 to 1973 he was the Minister of Post, Telegraph and Telephone, and later minister of Forest, Fishery and Livestock, Land Revenue and Land Reforms. In 1974 he resigned from the cabinet over his medical condition. He was elected to Parliament in 1979 from Gopalganj.

Death
In died in 1979 in Dhaka, Bangladesh.

References

Awami League politicians
1979 deaths
Ambassadors of Bangladesh to Lebanon
1926 births
2nd Jatiya Sangsad members
Bangladesh Krishak Sramik Awami League central committee members